Wyton may refer to the following places in England:
 Wyton, Cambridgeshire
 Wyton, East Riding of Yorkshire

Wyton may also refer to:
 RAF Wyton, an RAF airbase near Wyton, Cambridgeshire

See also
 Witton (disambiguation)